The 2008 Thurrock Council election took place on 1 May 2008 to elect members of Thurrock Council in Essex, England. One third of the council was up for election and the council stayed under no overall control.

After the election, the composition of the council was
Conservative 24
Labour 22
Independent 2
British National Party 1

Campaign
The 2008 election in Thurrock was seen as one of the key national contests with the Conservatives needing to gain one seat to take overall control. Important issues in the election included recycling, local bus services and race relations.

18 seats were contested in the election with the Tilbury Riverside and Thurrock Park seat being a by-election after the previous councillor resigned. The Conservatives, Labour and British National Party contested all 18 seats except in East Tilbury where the Conservatives did not put up a candidate. There were also 8 Liberal Democrats and 2 other candidates.

Election results
The results saw the council stay under no overall control but with the British National Party gaining a seat. The Conservatives remained the largest party on the council after winning 10 of the seats contested as compared to 6 for Labour. The final seat was won by independent Barry Palmer in East Tilbury.

While the Conservatives were still just short of an overall majority they remained in control of the council due to their existing agreement with the 2 independent councillors. Both main parties said they would not work with the new British National Party councillor, although she said she did not want to work with them anyway.

Following the election in March 2009, Terry Hipsey, the then Conservative leader of the council, defected from the Conservatives to Labour, leaving each of the major parties with 23 councillors.

Ward results

References

2008
2008 English local elections
2000s in Essex